Western Gold is a 1937 American Western film directed by Howard Bretherton and written by Earle Snell and Forrest Barnes. The film stars Smith Ballew, Heather Angel, LeRoy Mason, Howard Hickman, Ben Alexander, Frank McGlynn, Sr. and Otis Harlan. The film was released on August 27, 1937, by 20th Century Fox.

Plot
Bill Gibson is asked if he can stop the holdups of a needed gold shipment, when everyone refuses to take out the shipment due to all the killings, Bill volunteers.

Cast   
Smith Ballew as Bill Gibson
Heather Angel as Jeannie Thatcher
LeRoy Mason as Fred Foster
Howard Hickman as Thatcher
Ben Alexander as Bart
Frank McGlynn, Sr. as Abraham Lincoln
Otis Harlan as Jake
Victor Potel as Jasper
Lew Kelly as Storekeeper Ezra
Al Bridge as Holman 
Tom London as Clem

References

External links 
 

1937 films
20th Century Fox films
American Western (genre) films
1937 Western (genre) films
Films directed by Howard Bretherton
American black-and-white films
Films produced by Sol Lesser
Films based on American novels
1930s English-language films
1930s American films